William Mack Buchanan (29 July 1924 – 14 June 1999) was a Scottish professional footballer who played as a full back in the Football League for Carlisle United and Barrow.

Buchanan was born in Tannochside, Lanarkshire. He played football for junior club Larkhall Thistle during the Second World War before joining Motherwell in 1944, but his only first-team appearance was in the 1946–47 Scottish League Cup, and he left for England in 1949. He signed for Carlisle United and played in the first nine league matches of the season before moving on again, together with Billy Gordon and a "substantial" fee, to another Third Division North club, Barrow, in exchange for Alex McIntosh. Buchanan settled at Barrow, and over the next six-and-a-half seasons he made 242 league appearances, after which he played for Lancashire Combination club Morecambe.

Buchanan died in Carlisle, Cumbria, in 1999 at the age of 74.

References

1924 births
1999 deaths
Footballers from North Lanarkshire
Scottish footballers
Association football fullbacks
Larkhall Thistle F.C. players
Motherwell F.C. players
Carlisle United F.C. players
Barrow A.F.C. players
Morecambe F.C. players
Scottish Junior Football Association players
English Football League players